White Valentine is a 1999 Korean romantic film directed by Yang Yun-ho. It stars Park Shin-yang with Jun Ji-hyun in her movie debut.

It is the story of a young woman who re-discovers her childhood pen pal from military service when she happens upon an epistolary exchange he sent to his dead girlfriend by a carrier pigeon.

Plot
As a young girl, Kim Jeong-min (Jun Ji-hyun) hated writing letters to soldiers because they never write her back once they learn her age. So instead, she pretends to be a teacher, and becomes pen pals with Park Hyun-jun (Park Shin-yang). They plan to meet in person at a train station, but Jeong-min never shows up, and thus their correspondence ends.

Later when Jeong-min reaches the age of twenty (though when this movie was shot Jun was only 17), Hyun-jun moves into her hometown. Since her parents died when she was little, Jeong-min has been living with her grandfather who owns the bookstore Somang Books. She also works at this bookstore but dreams of becoming a painter. Hyun-jun has become the owner of a pet shop for birds, and grieving over the death of his girlfriend in a car accident, he keeps sending her letters via carrier pigeon. While painting outdoors, Jeong-min sees Hyun-jun feeding some pigeons. As she watches him care for one wounded pigeon then give an apple to a child playing nearby, she falls in love with him at first sight. But the apple reminds her of the same apple painted on the envelopes from her yet unknown pen pal.

Cast
Park Shin-yang - Park Hyun-jun
Jun Ji-hyun - Kim Jeong-min
Jeon Moo-song - Jeong-min's grandfather
Kim Young-ok - flower shop lady
Yang Dong-geun - Han-seok
Kim Se-joon - Ji-seok
Jin-woo Kang - Postman

External links 
 
 
 

1999 films
1990s Korean-language films
1999 romantic drama films
South Korean romantic drama films